Donald Wailan-Walalangi (born April 14, 1960) is a retired tennis player from Indonesia, who represented his native country at the 1988 Summer Olympics in Seoul, South Korea. There he lost in the first round of the men's doubles competition to USA's eventual gold medalists Ken Flach and Robert Seguso, while partnering Suharyadi Suharyadi.

External links
 
 
 

1960 births
Living people
Indonesian male tennis players
Indonesian Christians
Tennis players at the 1988 Summer Olympics
Olympic tennis players of Indonesia
Place of birth missing (living people)
Asian Games medalists in tennis
Tennis players at the 1982 Asian Games
Tennis players at the 1986 Asian Games
Asian Games gold medalists for Indonesia
Asian Games bronze medalists for Indonesia
Medalists at the 1982 Asian Games
Medalists at the 1986 Asian Games
Sportspeople from Jakarta
Minahasa people
Southeast Asian Games gold medalists for Indonesia
Southeast Asian Games silver medalists for Indonesia
Southeast Asian Games bronze medalists for Indonesia
Southeast Asian Games medalists in tennis
Competitors at the 1983 Southeast Asian Games
20th-century Indonesian people
21st-century Indonesian people